The Peasant Party of Ukraine (Selyans'ka Partiya Ukrayiny, SelPU) is an  agrarian and socialist political party in Ukraine. It was created in 1992 as a successor of the Communist Party of Ukraine that was temporarily outlawed in 1991.

At the Ukrainian parliamentary election in 1994, the party obtained 2.74% of the votes and 19 out of 450 seats in the Verkhovna Rada. At the Ukrainian parliamentary election in 1998, it gained in coalition with the Socialist Party of Ukraine 8.56% of the vote and 35 seats. The SelPU faction in the Verkhovna Rada consisted of 14 deputies. After the creation of the new parliamentary faction Solidarity in 2000 a lot of deputies of the party moved to this new faction.

The following elections were not successful for the party. In the elections of 2002 the party won 0.37% of the votes,  in 2006 0.31% and in the 2007 elections the party did not participate.

In the 2004 presidential elections, the party supported the candidature of Viktor Yanukovych.

In 2011, the party decided to join the Socialist Party of Ukraine. On 28 January 2012, this decision was declared illegal by the Justice Ministry.

The party did not participate in the 2014 Ukrainian parliamentary election.

In 2019, it supported Yulia Tymoshenko as a presidential candidate.

Elections result

References

External links
Official website 

1992 establishments in Ukraine
Agrarian parties in Ukraine
Political parties established in 1992
Socialist parties in Ukraine